Mikasabonbetsu Dam  is a trapezoidal dam located in Hokkaido Prefecture in Japan. The dam is used for flood control. The catchment area of the dam is 35.4 km2. The dam impounds about 55  ha of land when full and can store 8620 thousand cubic meters of water. The construction of the dam was started on 1985 and completed in 2023.

References

Dams in Hokkaido